Sridevi (born Shree Amma Yanger Ayyapan; 13 August 1963  24 February 2018) was an Indian actress and film producer, who primarily worked in Telugu, Tamil ,Hindi and Malayalam films- in addition to few in Kannada too. Her acting career started in South Indian Cinema at the age of 4, with the Tamil film Kandan Karunai. She then made her early transition to adult roles by the age of 13 with Moondru Mudichu. Due to her immense popularity and pan-Indian appeal, she was often cited as the first female superstar of Indian Cinema. Sridevi's performances in films in a variety of genres had earned her praise and awards. During her career, she won 6 Filmfare Awards: 3 in Hindi, 2 in Tamil and 1 in Telugu. Her 15-year-long comeback was the awaited film, English Vinglish (2012). After English Vinglish, Sridevi worked in her last Tamil film Puli in 2015 (which was also her comeback to Kollywood industry after a long gap of 30 years) and her last Hindi film as Mom in 2017 (which was the latter's 300th major final appearance). She received the National Film Award for Best Actress for Mom. Sridevi's last role was a brief cameo appearance in Zero- 10 months released in December 2018, after her untimely demise the same year. Sridevi has overall featured in 92 Telugu films, 73 Tamil films, 72 Hindi films, 25 Malayalam films and 5 Kannada films- which total up to 271 films along with a couple of cameo appearances in her 50-year long & illustrious career. This included one Hindi T.V serial too as Malini Iyer (2004), which also marked her comeback to television after 7 years since her sabbatical from film acting in 1997 (post her marriage and further family concentration).

Telugu

Tamil

Hindi

Malayalam

Kannada

Television

Bibliography

References

Indian filmographies
Actress filmographies